AC Vantaan Allianssi (or AC Allianssi) was a Finnish football club, based in the town of Vantaa.

History
Allianssi were a club in decline, following an 8–0 defeat at fellow Finnish club FC Haka. The match was believed to have been fixed by a Belgian-Chinese betting cartel, which took control of the club in summer 2005. A subsequent police investigation failed to find sufficient evidence of match fixing though. In 2006, a former managing director, Olivier Suray, admitted that the notorious match was fixed. However, he accused Chinese owner Ye Zheyun for fixing.

On 11 April 2006, club chairman Erkki Salo announced that the club would be filing for bankruptcy with immediate effect.

Domestic history

European history

Honours
Finnish League Cup (2) 2004, 2005

References

 
Allianssi
Sport in Vantaa
2002 establishments in Finland
2006 disestablishments in Finland
Association football clubs established in 2006
Sports clubs disestablished in 2006